Drink the Sea - The Remixes is a 2-volume release featuring remixes of tracks from the 2010 Drink the Sea album by the American electronic music trio The Glitch Mob. It was first released via the band's Glass Air Records imprint on January 13, 2011 to raise money and awareness for Download to Donate for Haiti V2.0, a Music For Relief charity project.

Volume 1 Track Listing

Volume 2 Track Listing

References

External links

2011 albums
The Glitch Mob albums